Carina Schlüter (born 8 November 1996) is a German footballer who plays as a goalkeeper for RB Leipzig. She has also played some matches for Germany.

Career

Statistics

References

External links
 

1996 births
Living people
People from Minden
Sportspeople from Detmold (region)
German women's footballers
Germany women's international footballers
Women's association football goalkeepers
Frauen-Bundesliga players
2. Frauen-Bundesliga players
VfL Bochum (women) players
SC Sand players
FC Bayern Munich (women) players
Footballers from North Rhine-Westphalia